Hugh Walters may refer to:
Hugh Walters (actor) (1939–2015), British actor
Hugh Walters (author) (1910–1993), British writer of juvenile science fiction novels